Peter G. Thomson House, commonly known as Laurel Court, is a registered historic building in Cincinnati, Ohio, listed in the National Register on November 29, 1979.

Currently the house is a private residence that is available for tours by reservation and for special events.

Design and construction
Peter G. Thomson, founder of The Champion Coated Paper Co., began construction on Laurel Court in 1902. He selected James Gamble Rogers, the nephew of Peter's wife, Laura Gamble Thomson, to design the Gilded Age mansion. Rogers based the house's ordonnance and design on the Trianon de Marbre, the Grand Trianon at Versailles, France, as can be seen from the duplication of the Grand Trianon's decorated Ionic order and the concept of a colonnade between cubical pavilions. The house is smaller than the Grand Trianon, it is revetted in simple stone rather than the marble of the French prototype, it is two stories rather than one, and was adapted to meet the requirements of a private residence at the time of construction. 
The Thomson family moved into the College Hill residence in 1907.

Features
 Atrium with a retractable roof
 Rookwood tile swimming pool
 Turkish carpets
 Library paneled in African rosewood
 Music room decorated in gold leaf

Historic uses
Single Dwelling
Secondary Structure
Residence of the Archbishop of Cincinnati (1947-1977)
Former residence of Donald Larosa

References

External links

 
 Documentation from the University of Cincinnati

Historic house museums in Ohio
Houses completed in 1907
Houses in Cincinnati
Houses on the National Register of Historic Places in Ohio
Museums in Cincinnati
National Register of Historic Places in Cincinnati
Cincinnati Local Historic Landmarks
Gilded Age mansions